Masdevallia tovarensis is a species of orchid endemic to northern Venezuela.

References

External links 

tovarensis
Endemic orchids of Venezuela